Haris Khan (born 25 March 1995) is a Pakistani cricketer who played in eleven first-class and thirteen List A matches for Hyderabad from 2013 to 2015.

References

External links
 

1993 births
Living people
Pakistani cricketers
Hyderabad (Pakistan) cricketers
People from Shaheed Benazir Abad District